Kyaukpyok is a village in Mindon Township, Thayet District, in the Magway Region of southwestern Burma. In 1929 it was documented to have a population of 140 with one well, supplemented by water from the Inma Chaung, two miles away.

References

External links
Maplandia World Gazetteer

Populated places in Thayet District
Mindon Township